John Hungerford Penruddocke (23 January 1770 – 25 December 1841) was a Tory politician in the United Kingdom.

Family
Penruddocke was the eldest son of Charles Penruddocke (died 1788) of Compton Chamberlayne, Wiltshire, and Anne Henrietta, daughter of Wadham Wyndham of Fyfield, also in Wiltshire. He was educated at Harrow School (from 1785) and New College, Oxford (from 1789). He married on 3 October 1789 Maria Anne, daughter of John Pearse of Chute Standen, Wiltshire. They had no children; she died on 5 April 1831. On his death he left his estate, including Compton House, to his great-nephew Charles (1828–1899).

Public life
Penruddocke commanded the Hindon troop of the volunteer Wiltshire Yeoman Cavalry from 1799. He was High Sheriff of Wiltshire for 1817–18 and Mayor of Wilton in 1818–19.

He was Member of Parliament (MP) for Wilton from 1823 until he stood down at the 1837 general election. He was a general supporter of the Liverpool ministry. In February 1829 he was listed by Joseph Planta, the patronage secretary, as "opposed to the principle" of the ministry's Catholic emancipation bill. He also voted against Jewish emancipation on 17 May of that year. After the Great Reform, he sat for Wilton as a Conservative from 1832 to his retirement in 1837.

Memorial
The names of John Hungerford Pennruddocke and of his wife Mary Anne appear on the family's memorial tablet in St Michael's Church, Compton Chamberlayne.

References

External links

1770 births
1841 deaths
Tory MPs (pre-1834)
Members of the Parliament of the United Kingdom for English constituencies
UK MPs 1820–1826
UK MPs 1826–1830
UK MPs 1830–1831
UK MPs 1831–1832
UK MPs 1832–1835
UK MPs 1835–1837
People educated at Harrow School
Alumni of New College, Oxford
High Sheriffs of Wiltshire